"Joyride" is a song by Swedish pop duo Roxette. Written by Per Gessle, it was released on 25 February 1991 as the lead single from their third studio album, Joyride (1991). It became one of Roxette's biggest hits, and was one of the most successful singles of 1991, topping multiple record charts across Europe, as well as in Australia, Canada, and the United States. The song's accompanying music video received heavy rotation on MTV Europe.

Recording and release
Per Gessle has said that the opening line of the song was inspired by a note his girlfriend (now wife) left on his piano, which read: "Hej, din tok, jag älskar dig" ("Hello, you fool, I love you"). Its title was derived from an interview in which Paul McCartney compared writing songs with John Lennon to "a long joyride". Roxette's former tour manager Dave Edwards is credited with narration on the song.

Critical reception
AllMusic editor Bryan Buss described the song as a "chanting carnival" in his review of the Joyride album. Larry Flick from Billboard viewed it as a "playful pop/rock ditty with a catchy chorus that is destined to make a quick sprint up the charts." Jim Farber from Entertainment Weekly noted that "they blithely toss a bit of whistling into "Joyride", next to some psychedelic Beatles-like flourishes." Dave Sholin from the Gavin Report wrote, "Plenty of reason for joy in Top 40 land as Per Gessle and Marie Fredriksson deliver the first of a new batch of songs. Wisely, the Swedish duo retain "Look Sharp" producer Clarence Ofwerman, and, once again it's clear all three understand the way to a pop music fan's heart. Roxette has re-applied that happy, feelgood formula to making mass appeal records, and it's earned them instant recognition and remarkable chart success. This title track from their new album is certain to not only meet everyone's expectations, but surpass them." Pan-European magazine Music & Media complimented the song as "a perfect example of their pop sensibilities."

Brendon Veevers from Renowned for Sound commented, "There isn't a soul alive who cannot say they don’t love this track – Roxette fan or not. It's pop at its finest and the video is equally as memorable; the band speeding down a U.S highway, playing guitar on top of a red corvette." Rolling Stones J.D. Considine said that the song is "decked out in a glossy, Sgt. Pepper-style arrangement". Mark Frith from Smash Hits labeled it as a "over-the-top" pop song, "with catchy choruses that remind you slightly of those other musical Swedes, ABBA." A writer for Cleveland.com ranked "Joyride" the 46th best Billboard Hot 100 number one of the 1990s, saying: "Even more so than the group's biggest hit, 'It Must Have Been Love,' 'Joyride' showed off Per Gessle's ability to craft fantastic pop-rock songs. The song's pop spirit and rock swagger mesh seamlessly."

Commercial performance
The song became one of the duo's biggest hits and was one of the most successful singles of 1991. It was their first number one single in their home country and their first platinum-certified single there. It also topped the charts in numerous other territories, including Austria, the Netherlands, Norway, Spain and Switzerland. The song spent eight weeks at number one in Germany, where it was certified gold by the Bundesverband Musikindustrie for sales in excess of 250,000 copies. "Joyride" peaked at number four on the UK Singles Chart, their second-highest chart placing there—behind top three hit "It Must Have Been Love".

The song spent three weeks atop the Australian Singles Chart, and was certified platinum by the Australian Recording Industry Association for shipments in excess of 70,000 units. It went on to remain one of the top ten-best selling singles of the year in that country. It was their fourth and last number one single on the US Billboard Hot 100 chart. It also topped the national RPM singles chart in Canada, where it was certified gold by Music Canada (formerly the Canadian Recording Industry Association) for shipments in excess of 50,000 units, and nominated for a Juno Award in 1992 for Best Selling Single by a Foreign Artist.

In popular culture
During the 1994 Stanley Cup playoffs, the song was used as the intro music of the Vancouver Canucks as they took to the ice before each game.

Formats and track listings
All songs were written and composed by Per Gessle.

 Cassette and 7-inch single (Sweden 1364002 · UK TCEM177 · US 4JM-50342)
 "Joyride" (7-inch version) – 3:58
 "Come Back (Before You Leave)" – 4:34

 12-inch single (Sweden 1364006 · Germany 1C-060-1364006)
 "Joyride" (12-inch version / magicfriendmix) – 6:08
 "Joyride" (7-inch version) – 3:58
 "Come Back (Before You Leave)" – 4:34

 CD single (Sweden 1364002 · UK CDEM177)
 "Joyride" (7-inch version) – 3:58
 "Come Back (Before You Leave)" – 4:34
 "Joyride" (12-inch version / magicfriendmix) – 6:08
 "Joyride" (US remix) – 4:04

Personnel
Credits are adapted from the liner notes of The Rox Box/Roxette 86–06.

Studios
 Recorded in July 1990 at EMI Studios (Stockholm, Sweden)
 Mixed at EMI Studios

Musicians
 Dave Edwards – narration
 Marie Fredriksson – lead and background vocals
 Per Gessle – lead and background vocals, whistling, mixing
 Anders Herrlin – programming and engineering
 Jonas Isacsson – electric guitars
 Clarence Öfwerman – keyboards, programming and production, mixing
 Alar Suurna – mixing, engineering

Charts

Weekly charts

Year-end charts

Decade-end charts

Certifications

Release history

See also
 List of European number-one airplay songs of the 1990s
 List of number-one hits in Australia
 List of number-one hits in Austria
 List of number-one hits in Belgium (Flanders)
 List of number-one hits in Germany
 List of number-one hits in the Netherlands
 List of number-one hits in Norway
 List of number-one hits in Switzerland
 List of number-one hits on the Billboard Hot 100

External links

References

1991 songs
1991 singles
Roxette songs
Songs written by Per Gessle
Billboard Hot 100 number-one singles
Cashbox number-one singles
Dutch Top 40 number-one singles
European Hot 100 Singles number-one singles
Number-one singles in Australia
Number-one singles in Austria
Number-one singles in Belgium
Number-one singles in Denmark
Number-one singles in Finland
Number-one singles in Germany
Number-one singles in Norway
Number-one singles in Portugal
Number-one singles in Sweden
Number-one singles in Switzerland
Number-one singles in Zimbabwe
RPM Top Singles number-one singles
Juno Award for Best Selling Single singles
Songs about cars